The 2005–06 Mid-American Conference men's basketball season began with practices in October 2005, followed by the start of the 2005–06 NCAA Division I men's basketball season in November. Conference play began in January 2007 and concluded in March 2007. Kent State won the regular season title with a conference record of 15–3 over second-place Akron and Miami. Kent State defeated seventh-seeded Toledo in the MAC tournament final and represented the MAC in the NCAA tournament. There they lost in the first round to Pittsburgh.

Preseason awards
The preseason poll was announced by the league office on October 26, 2005.

Preseason men's basketball poll
(First place votes in parenthesis)

East Division
 Ohio (16) 153
  (6) 120
  (4) 85
  85
  79
  45

West Division
  (15) 135
  (5) 127
  (5) 114
  (1) 97
 Eastern Michigan 54
  40

Tournament champs
Ohio (14), Akron (5), Ball State (4), Miami (2), Toledo (1)

Honors

Postseason

Mid–American tournament

NCAA tournament

Postseason awards

Coach of the Year: Jim Christian, Kent State
Player of the Year: DeAndre Haynes,
Freshman of the Year: Maurice Acker, Ball State
Defensive Player of the Year: James Hughes, Northern Illinois
Sixth Man of the Year: Kevin Warzynski, Kent State

See also
2005–06 Mid-American Conference women's basketball season

References